Henning Larsen Architects is an international architectural firm based in Copenhagen, Denmark. Founded in 1959 by Henning Larsen, it has around 750 employees.

In 2008, it opened an office in Riyadh, Saudi Arabia and in 2011, an office in Munich, Germany were inaugurated. The company also have offices in New York USA, Oslo, Norway, in the Faroe Islands, and in Hong Kong, China.

It is known for its cultural and educational projects. Among them Harpa Concert Hall and Conference Centre in Reykjavík that was selected as one of the ten best concert halls in the world by the British magazine Gramophone and won the Mies van der Rohe Award 2013, the European Union Prize for Contemporary Architecture. It also designed the Copenhagen Opera.

It is part of the Ramboll Group.

Research and sustainability 
The practice has employed PhD students from the Technical University of Denmark, who work with different projects related to sustainable design. The aim of the collaboration is to implement sustainability in the building design and building components at the very beginning of each project.

Awards
 1989 Aga Khan Award for the Ministry of Foreign Affairs in Riyadh
 2008 RIBA Award for Roland Levinsky Building
 2010 LEAF Award for The Wave (residential category)
 2010 IDA International Design Award (Architectural Design of the Year category) for Batumi Aquarium
 2011 Civic Trust Award for The Wave
 2012 Civic Trust Award for Harpa - Reykjavik Concert Hall and Conference Centre
 2013 Civic Trust Award for Umea Arts Campus
 2013 Architizer A+ Award (+Light category) for Harpa - Reykjavik Concert Hall and Conference Centre 2013 European Union Prize for Contemporary Architecture for Harpa - Reykjavik Concert Hall and Conference Centre 2013 Emirates Glass Leaf Award for Harpa – Reykjavik Concert Hall and Conference Centre (Best Public Building - Culture)
 2013 Emirates Glass Leaf Award for Campus Roskilde (Best Public Building - Education & Research)
 2014 Civic Trust Award for Campus Roskilde 2015 Civic Trust Award for Mosgaard Museum2015 The International Architecture Award (The Chicago Athenaeum: Museum of Architecture and Design) for Moesgaard Museum  
2015 LEAF Award in the category Urban Design for Vinge Train Station  
2016 Green Good Design Award (The Chicago Athenaeum: Museum of Architecture and Design and The European Centre for Architecture Art Design and Urban Studies) for SDU Campus Kolding   
2016 LEAF Future Building Awards in the category Under Construction for Kiruna City Hall''

Exhibitions 
 1999 "The Architect's Studio" at Louisiana Museum of Modern Art, Humlebaek, Denmark
 2011 "what if...?" at Utzon Center, Aalborg, Denmark. The exhibition has also been displayed in Umeå, Munich and at Danish Architecture Centre as a part of the exhibition

See also
 Architecture of Denmark
 List of Danish architectural firms

References

Architecture firms of Denmark
Architecture firms based in Copenhagen
Companies based in Copenhagen Municipality
Danish companies established in 1959
Design companies established in 1959
1959 establishments in Denmark